Uthman ibn Ibrahim was a Karakhanid ruler in Transoxiana from 1204 to 1212.

Biography 

Uthman was the son of the Karakhanid Ibrahim ibn Hussein (1178-1202/1203). 
According to Karev, Uthman came to power in 1202/1203. 
His residence was in Samarkand. According to Aufi, who knew him personally, Uthman was a highly educated person.

Uthman led a policy of maneuvering between the Qara Khitai and the Khwarezmshah Muhammad b. Tekish. He bore a high Turkic title (ulug sultan as-salatin). However, Uthman soon went over to the side of the Qara Khitans. Later he entered into an alliance with Muhammad Khwarezmshah as a vassal of the latter. In 1209-10, coins were minted in the name of these rulers. After the recognition of the power of the Khwarezmshahs by Uthman, other Karakhanids who ruled in Ferghana followed his example. Uthman married the daughter of Khwarezmshah Muhammad b. Tekish and went to live in Khwarezm. He returned to Samarkand, accompanied by the Khwarezm military. Uthman was dissatisfied with the Khwarezmians and revolted in 1211. In 1212 Muhammad b. Tekish invaded the Kara-Khanid Khanate, conquered Samarkand, and massacred the entire population. Uthman was executed following Samarkand's downfall.

References

Sources 

 Davidovich, E. A. (1998), "The Karakhanids", in Asimov, M.S.; Bosworth, C.E. (eds.), History of Civilisations of Central Asia, vol. 4 part I, UNESCO Publishing, p. 134-135.
 Kochnev B.D. Numizmaticheskaya istoriya Karakhanidskogo kaganata (991—1209 gg.). Moskva «Sofiya», 2006.

1212 deaths
Turkic rulers
13th-century Turkic people
Year of birth unknown
13th-century rulers in Asia